Robert-Baldwin is a provincial electoral district in the Montreal region of Quebec, Canada that elects members to the National Assembly of Quebec.  It includes a portion of the Pierrefonds-Roxboro borough of Montreal as well as the city of Dollard-des-Ormeaux.

It was created for the 1966 election from a part of Jacques-Cartier.

In the change from the 2001 to the 2011 electoral map, it gained a small additional part of Pierrefonds-Roxboro from the Nelligan electoral district.

It was named after former Prime Minister of the United Province of Canada, Robert Baldwin.

Linguistic demographics
Anglophone: 38.9%
Allophone: 39.0%
Francophone: 22.1%

Members of the Legislative Assembly / National Assembly

Election results

* Result compared to Action démocratique

|-
|}

|-
 
|New Democratic
|René Boulard
|align="right"|1,068
|align="right"|3.18
|align="right"|–
|-
 
|Progressive Conservative
|Hugh Rowe
|align="right"|467
|align="right"|1.39
|align="right"|–

|-
|}

|-
 
|Freedom of Choice
|Duncan C. Macdonald
|align="right"|495
|align="right"|1.43
|align="right"|–
|-

|-
|}

|-
 
|Independent
|Robert G. Beale
|align="right"|4,827  
|align="right"|12.04
|align="right"|–
|-
 
|Democratic Alliance
|George Donald Boutilier
|align="right"|2,188  
|align="right"|5.46
|align="right"|–
|-
 
|Ralliement créditiste
|Louis Lefebvre
|align="right"|410  
|align="right"|1.02
|align="right"|-1.15
|-
 
|Independent
|Leo Rotgaus
|align="right"|233  
|align="right"|0.58
|align="right"|–
|-
|}

|-
 
|Parti créditiste
|Jean J. St-Georges
|align="right"|701  
|align="right"|2.17
|align="right"|–
|-

|-

|-
|}

|-

|-
|}

|-
 
|Independent
|Arthur-Ewen Séguin 
|align="right"|19,506            
|align="right"|53.32
|-

|-
 
|Independent
|John Patrick Boyle
|align="right"|1,287  
|align="right"|3.52
|-
 
|RIN
|Yves Gariépy
|align="right"|900
|align="right"|2.46
|-
 
|Ralliement national
|Jean-Paul Trudel
|align="right"|144
|align="right"|0.39
|-
|}

References

External links
Information
 Elections Quebec

Election results
 Election results (National Assembly)
 Election results (QuébecPolitique)

Maps
 2011 map (PDF)
 2001 map (Flash)
2001–2011 changes (Flash)
1992–2001 changes (Flash)
 Electoral map of Montreal region 
 Quebec electoral map, 2011 

Provincial electoral districts of Montreal
Quebec provincial electoral districts
Dollard-des-Ormeaux
Pierrefonds-Roxboro